Zafiris Dimitriadis (born 26 October 1975) is a retired Greek football defender.

References

1975 births
Living people
Greek footballers
Iraklis Thessaloniki F.C. players
Pierikos F.C. players
Agrotikos Asteras F.C. players
Super League Greece players
Association football defenders